is a science museum in Isogo-ku, Yokohama, Kanagawa, Japan.

The museum is called  under the sponsorship of the Bank of Yokohama.

External links
 Hamagin Space Science Center

Museums in Yokohama
Science museums in Japan
Aerospace museums in Japan